Rolf Pfeifer (born 1947) is a former professor of computer science at the Department of Informatics University of Zurich, and director of the Artificial Intelligence Laboratory, where he retired from in 2014. Currently he is a specially appointed professor at Osaka University, and a visiting professor at Shanghai Jiao Tong University.

He has a master's degree in physics and mathematics and a Ph.D. in computer science from the Swiss Federal Institute of Technology (ETH) in Zurich, Switzerland. He spent three years as a post-doctoral fellow at Carnegie Mellon University and at Yale University in the U.S.

Having worked as a visiting professor and research fellow at Free University of Brussels, the MIT Artificial Intelligence Laboratory, the Neurosciences Institute (NSI) in San Diego, and the Sony Computer Science Laboratory in Paris, he was elected "21st Century COE Professor, Information Science and Technology" at the University of Tokyo for 2003/2004, from where he held the first global, fully interactive, videoconferencing-based lecture series "The AI Lectures from Tokyo" (including Tokyo, Beijing, Jeddah, Warsaw, Munich, and Zurich). This lectures were renamed the ShanghAI Lectures  and since 2009 they have been broadcast all over the world.

He is the author of the books Understanding Intelligence (co-author: C. Scheier), How the Body Shapes the Way We Think: A New View of Intelligence MIT Press, 2006 (with Josh Bongard), and "Designing Intelligence" (with Josh Bongard and Don Berry). He has published over 100 scientific articles.   
                                  
His research interests include Embodied cognition, Biorobotics, Autonomous agents/mobile robots, Artificial life, Morphology/morpho-functional machines, Situated Design, Emotion.

Books
 Understanding Intelligence, Bradford Books, 2001; with Christian Scheier
 How the Body Shapes the Way We Think: A New View of Intelligence, Bradford Books, 2006; with Josh Bongard
 Designing Intelligence Paperback, GRIN, 2013, with Josh Bongard, Don Berry

External links
Rolf Pfeifer's homepage at the Artificial Intelligence Laboratory

References

Artificial intelligence researchers
Swiss roboticists
1947 births
Living people
People associated with the University of Zurich
Academic staff of the University of Zurich
Researchers of artificial life